HRESH (Armenian: Հրեշ; 'monster'), also spelled as HREESH, is a loitering munition developed by the Armenian ProMAQ group. The HRESH was first unveiled at the ArmHiTec-2018 exhibition with several other loitering munitions, constituting the first-known loitering munitions produced in Armenia. One Israeli news outlet noted the drone's resemblance to the Israeli Hero-30 drone.

Specifications 

 Crew: 0 (unmanned)
 Weight: 7 kg
 Capacity: 1.6 kg
 Max Ceiling: 1 km
 Range: 20 km

See also 

 Category:Unmanned aerial vehicles of Armenia

References 

Armenian inventions
Unmanned military aircraft of Armenia